Fabrice Levrat (born October 18, 1979), is a retired French football midfielder. He played for AS Monaco, AC Ajaccio, Amiens SC, FC Gueugnon, Stade Laval, and US Boulogne.

References

External links
 
 Profile at L'Équipe
 

1979 births
Living people
People from Bourgoin-Jallieu
Association football midfielders
French footballers
AS Monaco FC players
AC Ajaccio players
FC Gueugnon players
Amiens SC players
Stade Lavallois players
US Boulogne players
Ligue 2 players
Ligue 1 players
Championnat National players
Sportspeople from Isère
Footballers from Auvergne-Rhône-Alpes